The Tupolev Tu-324 is a 30–50 seat regional jet passenger airliner. The jet will be twin-powered by Ivchenko-Progress AI-22 or Rolls-Royce BR710 turbofan engines. The plane will be available as a corporate plane for eight–ten executives. The range for the three aircraft variants will be 2500 km, 5000 km and 7000 km. The cargo version can carry 3000 kg of cargo and a range of 5900 km is expected. The Tu-324 is designed to replace aging Yak-40, Tu-134, An-24 and An-26s on Russia's regional routes.

Production

The executive version would be equipped with a satellite phone, FAX, and a PC outlet. The Tupolev Tu-324 would be able to operate from gravel and dirt airfields, providing safety and comfort of the passengers. The Tupolev Tu-324 would be produced at the S.P.Gorbunov Aircraft Production Association in Kazan, Russia. Estimated price is between $19–23 Million USD.

In recent years, despite politicians of the Tatarstan region fighting for the project, only little progress was made as United Aircraft Corporation has focused on fostering the Sukhoi Superjet, Antonov An-148 and Irkut MC-21 projects instead. In 2016, manufacturing of the TU-324 was proposed among similar projects, but United Aircraft Corporation decided to restart production of the Ilyushin Il-114 instead.

Variants

Tu-324
Tu-414

Specifications (proposed)

See also
 Yak-40
 Tupolev Tu-134

References

External links

 Tupolev Tu-324/Tu-414 page
 Tu-324, Tu-324A by Tupolev KB

Tu-0324
Twinjets